Guabancex is the zemi or deity of chaos and disorder which the Taíno natives in Puerto Rico, Hispaniola, Jamaica, and Cuba, Arawak natives elsewhere in the Caribbean. She was described as a mercurial goddess that controlled the weather, conjuring storms known as "juracán" when displeased. The latter term was later used to name the climatological phenomenon that is now known as a hurricane in the Western Hemisphere.

The Taínos were aware of the spiraling wind pattern of hurricanes, a knowledge that they used when depicting the deity. Her zemi idol was said to depict a woman, but the most common depiction of Guabancex presents a furious face with her arms extended in a "~" pattern.

Etymology
From Juracán we derive the Spanish word huracán and eventually the English word hurricane. As the pronunciation varied across indigenous groups, many of the alternative names, as mentioned in the OED, included furacan, furican, haurachan, herycano, hurachano, hurricano, and so on.

The term made an early appearance in William Shakespeare's King Lear (Act 3, Scene 2) and in Troilus and Cressida (Act 5, Scene 2), in which Shakespeare gives the following definition:

the dreadful spout Which shipmen do the hurricano call, Constringed [i.e., compressed] in mass by the almighty sun.

Mythology
 
According to Taíno mythology, the zemi of Guabancex was entrusted to the ruler of a mystical land, Aumatex. This granted her the title of "Cacique of the Wind", but it also imposed the responsibility of repeatedly appeasing the goddess throughout her long reign. Furthermore, due to the importance of the wind for travel between island and the need of good weather imperative for a successful crop, other caciques would offer her part of their food during the cohoba ceremony. However, given Guabancex's volatile temper, these efforts often failed. When they did, she would leave her domain enraged and with the intent of bringing destruction to all in her path, unleashing the juracánes.

She began by interrupting the balance established by Boinayel and Marohu, the deities of rain and drought. By rotating her arms in a spiral, Guabancex would pick the water of the ocean and land, placing it under the command of Coatrisquie, who violently forced it back over the Taíno settlements destroying their bohios and crops. She would threaten the other deities in an attempt to have them join the chaos. She was always preceded by Guataubá, who heralded her eventual arrival with clouds, lightning and thunder.

The easternmost of the Greater Antilles, Puerto Rico is often in the path of the North Atlantic tropical storms and hurricanes which tend to come ashore on the east coast. The Taíno believed that upon reaching the rainforest peak of El Yunque, the goddess and her cohorts would clash with their supreme deity, Yúcahu, who was believed to live there.

Guabancex has an unspecified connection to Caorao, a deity that was also associated with storms and that was said to bring them forth by playing the cobo, a musical instrument made from a marine sea shell.

See also
Huracan

References

Bibliography
Author unknown (2008-07-30). El dios Juracán era una deidad femenina ["God Juracan was a feminine Goddess"]. Primera Hora ["First Hour"], Spanish, 30 July 2008. Retrieved from http://www.primerahora.com/noticias/puerto-rico/nota/eldiosjuracaneraunadeidadfemenina-215036/.

Chaos gods
Sky and weather goddesses
Taíno mythology